Ulysses S. Grant (born Hiram Ulysses Grant,  ; April 27, 1822July 23, 1885) was an American military officer and politician who served as the 18th president of the United States from 1869 to 1877. As Commanding General, he led the Union Army to victory in the American Civil War in 1865 and thereafter briefly served as secretary of war. Later, as president, Grant was an effective civil rights executive who signed the bill that created the Justice Department and worked with Radical Republicans to protect African Americans during Reconstruction.

Born and raised in Ohio, Grant possessed an exceptional ability with horses. Admitted to West Point, Grant graduated 21st in the class of 1843 and served with distinction in the Mexican–American War. In 1848, he married Julia Dent, and together they had four children. Grant resigned from the army in 1854 and returned to his family but lived in poverty. He joined the Union Army shortly after the American Civil War broke out in 1861 and rose to prominence after winning early Union victories in the western theater. In 1863, he led the Vicksburg campaign, which gained control of the Mississippi River, dealing a serious strategic blow to the Confederacy, splitting it in two. President Abraham Lincoln promoted him to lieutenant general after his victory at Chattanooga. For thirteen months, Grant fought Robert E. Lee during the high-casualty Overland Campaign and at Petersburg. After Lee fled Petersburg, Grant surrounded and captured his army at Appomattox. On April 9, 1865, Lee formally surrendered to Grant. A week later, Lincoln was assassinated and was succeeded by Andrew Johnson, who promoted Grant to General of the Army in 1866. Later, Grant openly broke with Johnson over Reconstruction policies; Grant used the Reconstruction Acts, which had been passed over Johnson's veto, to enforce civil rights for recently freed African Americans.

A war hero, drawn in by his sense of duty, Grant was unanimously nominated by the Republican Party and was elected president in 1868. As president, Grant stabilized the post-war national economy, supported Congressional Reconstruction and the ratification of the Fifteenth Amendment, and crushed the Ku Klux Klan. Under Grant, the Union was completely restored. He appointed African Americans and Jewish Americans to prominent federal offices. In 1871, Grant created the first Civil Service Commission, advancing the civil service more than any prior president. 

The Liberal Republicans and Democrats united behind Grant's opponent in the 1872 presidential election, but Grant was handily reelected. Grant's Native American policy was to assimilate Indians into White culture; the Great Sioux War was fought during his term. Grant's foreign policy was mostly peaceful, without war, the Alabama Claims against Great Britain skillfully resolved. However, his prized Caribbean Dominican Republic annexation was rejected by the Senate.

The Grant administration was often remembered primarily for a number of scandals, including the Gold Ring and the Whiskey Ring, but modern scholarship has better appreciated Grant's appointed reformers and prosecutions. Grant appointed John Brooks Henderson and David Dyer, who prosecuted the Whiskey Ring; Benjamin Bristow and Edwards Pierrepont, who served as Grant's anti-corruption team; and Zachariah Chandler, who cleaned up corruption in the Interior. Grant's administration prosecuted Mormon polygamists in 1871, vice crimes such as pornography, and abortion from 1873 to 1877. The Panic of 1873 plunged the nation into a severe economic depression that allowed the Democrats to win the House majority. In the intensely disputed 1876 presidential election, Grant facilitated the approval by Congress of a peaceful compromise.

With the tour he took in his retirement, Grant became the first president to circumnavigate the world, dining with Queen Victoria and meeting many other prominent foreign leaders. In 1880, Grant was unsuccessful in obtaining the Republican presidential nomination for a third term. In the final year of his life, facing severe financial reversals and dying of throat cancer, he wrote his memoirs, which proved to be a major critical and financial success. They were published in two volumes in 1885 and 1886 by Mark Twain, shortly after Grant's death. Grant biographer Ronald C. White Jr. called the book "one of the finest memoirs in American letters". At the time of his death, he was memorialized as a symbol of national unity. Grant was a modern general and "a skillful leader who had a natural grasp of tactics and strategy".

Historical assessments and rankings of Grant were negative about and his presidency until around the end of the 20th century. Historically, Grant's critics take a negative view of his economic mismanagement, corruption within his cabinet as well as the subsequent political scandals, and his failed Dominican Republic annexation treaty. By contrast, his admirers emphasize Grant's concern for Native Americans and enforcement of civil and voting rights, as well as effectively wiping out the Ku Klux Klan during his lifetime.

Early life and education

Hiram Ulysses Grant was born in Point Pleasant, Ohio, on April 27, 1822, to Jesse Root Grant, a tanner and merchant, and Hannah Simpson Grant. His ancestors Matthew and Priscilla Grant arrived aboard the ship Mary and John at Massachusetts Bay Colony in 1630. Grant's great-grandfather fought in the French and Indian War, and his grandfather, Noah, served in the American Revolution at Bunker Hill. Afterward, Noah settled in Pennsylvania and married Rachel Kelley,  the daughter of an Irish pioneer. Their son Jesse (Ulysses's father) was a Whig Party supporter and a fervent abolitionist. Jesse Grant moved to Point Pleasant in 1820 and found work as a foreman in a tannery. He soon met his future wife, Hannah, and the two were married on June 24, 1821. Hannah descended from Presbyterian immigrants from Ballygawley in County Tyrone, Ireland. Ten months after she was married, Hannah gave birth to Ulysses, her and Jesse's first child. The boy's name, Ulysses, was drawn from ballots placed in a hat. To honor his father-in-law, Jesse named the boy Hiram Ulysses, though he would always refer to him as Ulysses.

In 1823, the family moved to Georgetown, Ohio, where five more siblings were born: Simpson, Clara, Orvil, Jennie, and Mary. At the age of five, Ulysses began his formal education, starting at a subscription school and later in two private schools. In the winter of 1836–1837, Grant was a student at Maysville Seminary, and in the autumn of 1838, he attended John Rankin's academy. In his youth, Grant developed an unusual ability to ride and manage horses. Grant disliked the tannery, so his father put his ability with horses to use by giving him work driving wagon loads of supplies and transporting people. Unlike his siblings, Grant was not forced to attend church by his Methodist parents. For the rest of his life, he prayed privately and never officially joined any denomination. To others, including his own son, Grant appeared to be an agnostic. He inherited some of Hannah's Methodist piety and quiet nature. Grant was largely apolitical before the war but wrote, "If I had ever had any political sympathies they would have been with the Whigs. I was raised in that school."

Early military career and personal life

West Point and first assignment

Grant's father wrote to Representative Thomas L. Hamer requesting that he nominate Ulysses to the United States Military Academy (USMA) at West Point, New York. Despite political differences with Jesse Root Grant, Hamer, a Democrat, nominated his 17-year-old son to West Point in spring 1839. Grant was accepted on July 1, although he doubted his academic abilities. Hamer, unfamiliar with Grant, submitted an incorrect name to West Point. On September 14 Grant was enlisted Cadet "U.S. Grant" at the national academy. His nickname at West Point became "Sam" among army colleagues since the initials "U.S." also stood for "Uncle Sam".

Initially, Grant was indifferent to military life, but within a year he reexamined his desire to leave the academy and later wrote that "on the whole I like this place very much". While at the academy, his greatest interest was horses, and he earned a reputation as the "most proficient" horseman. During the graduation ceremony, while riding York, a large and powerful horse that only Grant could manage, he set a high-jump record that stood for 25 years. Seeking relief from military routine, he studied under Romantic artist Robert Walter Weir, producing nine surviving artworks. He spent more time reading books from the library than his academic texts, including works by James Fenimore Cooper and others. On Sundays, cadets were required to march to and attend services at the academy's church, a requirement that Grant disliked. Quiet by nature, Grant established a few intimate friends among fellow cadets, including Frederick Tracy Dent and James Longstreet. He was inspired both by the Commandant, Captain Charles F. Smith, and by General Winfield Scott, who visited the academy to review the cadets. Grant later wrote of the military life, "there is much to dislike, but more to like."

Grant graduated on June 30, 1843, ranked 21st out of 39 in his class and was promoted the next day to the rank brevet second lieutenant. Grant planned to resign his commission after his four-year term of duty. He would later write to a friend that among the happiest days of his life were the day he left the presidency and the day he left the academy. Despite his excellent horsemanship, he was not assigned to the cavalry, but to the 4th Infantry Regiment. Grant's first assignment took him to the Jefferson Barracks near St. Louis, Missouri. Lt. Col. Robert C. Buchanan fined Grant wine bottles for Grant's late returns from White Haven. Commanded by Colonel Stephen W. Kearny, the barracks was the nation's largest military base in the West. Grant was happy with his new commander but looked forward to the end of his military service and a possible teaching career.

Marriage and family
In Missouri, Grant visited Dent's family and became engaged to Dent's sister, Julia, in 1844. Four years later on August 22, 1848, they were married at Julia's home in St. Louis. Grant's abolitionist father disapproved of the Dents' owning slaves, and neither of Grant's parents attended the wedding. Grant was flanked by three fellow West Point graduates, all dressed in their blue uniforms, including Longstreet, Julia's cousin. At the end of the month, Julia was warmly received by Grant's family in Bethel, Ohio. They had four children: Frederick, Ulysses Jr. ("Buck"), Ellen ("Nellie"), and Jesse. After the wedding, Grant obtained a two-month extension to his leave and returned to St. Louis when he decided, with a wife to support, that he would remain in the army.

Mexican–American War

After rising tensions with Mexico following the United States annexation of Texas, war broke out in 1846. During the conflict, Grant distinguished himself as a daring and competent soldier. Before the war President John Tyler had ordered Grant's unit to Louisiana as part of the Army of Occupation under Major General Zachary Taylor. In September 1846, Tyler's successor, James K. Polk, unable to provoke Mexico into war at Corpus Christi, Texas, ordered Taylor to march 150 miles south to the Rio Grande. Marching south to Fort Texas, to prevent a Mexican siege, Grant experienced combat for the first time on May 8, 1846, at the Battle of Palo Alto.

Grant served as regimental quartermaster, but yearned for a combat role; when finally allowed, he led a charge at the Battle of Resaca de la Palma. He demonstrated his equestrian ability at the Battle of Monterrey by volunteering to carry a dispatch past snipers, where he hung off the side of his horse, keeping the animal between him and the enemy. Before leaving the city he assured some wounded Americans he would send for help. Polk, wary of Taylor's growing popularity, divided his forces, sending some troops (including Grant's unit) to form a new army under Major General Winfield Scott. Traveling by sea, Scott's army landed at Veracruz and advanced toward Mexico City. The army met the Mexican forces at the battles of Molino del Rey and Chapultepec outside Mexico City. For his bravery at Molino del Rey, Grant was brevetted first lieutenant on September 30. At San Cosmé, Grant directed his men to drag a disassembled howitzer into a church steeple, then reassembled it and bombarded nearby Mexican troops. His bravery and initiative earned him his brevet promotion to captain. On September 14, 1847, Scott's army marched into the city; Mexico ceded the vast territory, including California, to the U.S. on February 2, 1848.

During the war, Grant established a commendable record, studied the tactics and strategies of Scott and Taylor, and emerged as a seasoned officer, writing in his memoirs that this is how he learned much about military leadership. In retrospect, although he respected Scott, he identified his leadership style with Taylor's. However, Grant also wrote that the Mexican war was morally unjust and that the territorial gains were designed to expand slavery, stating, "I was bitterly opposed to the measure ... and to this day, regard the war which resulted as one of the most unjust ever waged by a stronger against a weaker nation." He opined that the Civil War was divine punishment on the U.S. for its aggression against Mexico. During the war, Grant discovered his "moral courage" and began to consider a career in the army.

Historians increasingly have pointed to the importance of Grant's experience as an assistant quartermaster during the war. Although he was initially averse to the position, it prepared Grant in understanding military supply routes, transportation systems, and logistics, particularly with regard to "provisioning a large, mobile army operating in hostile territory," according to biographer Ronald White. Grant came to recognize how wars could be won or lost by crucial factors that lay beyond the tactical battlefield. Serving as assistant quartermaster made Grant a complete soldier, and learning how to supply an entire army gave Grant the training to sustain large armies.

Post-war assignments and resignation
Grant's first post-war assignments took him and Julia to Detroit on November 17, 1848, but he was soon transferred to Madison Barracks, a desolate outpost in upstate New York, in bad need of supplies and repair. After four months, Grant was sent back to his quartermaster job in Detroit. When the discovery of gold in California brought droves of prospectors and settlers to the territory, Grant and the 4th infantry were ordered to reinforce the small garrison there. Grant was charged with bringing the soldiers and a few hundred civilians from New York City to Panama, overland to the Pacific and then north to California. Julia, eight months pregnant with Ulysses Jr., did not accompany him. While Grant was in Panama, a cholera epidemic broke out and claimed the lives of many soldiers, civilians, and children. Grant established and organized a field hospital in Panama City, and moved the worst cases to a hospital barge one mile offshore. When orderlies protested having to attend to the sick, Grant did much of the nursing himself, earning high praise from observers. In August, Grant arrived in San Francisco. His next assignment sent him north to Vancouver Barracks in the Oregon Territory.

Grant tried several business ventures but failed, and in one instance his business partner absconded with $800 of Grant's investment, . Concerning local Indians, Grant assured Julia, by letter, they were harmless, and he developed empathy for their plight. Grant witnessed white agents cheating Indians of their supplies, and the devastation of smallpox and measles, transferred by white settlers.

Promoted to captain on August 5, 1853, Grant was assigned to command Company F, 4th Infantry, at the newly constructed Fort Humboldt in California. Grant arrived at Fort Humboldt on January 5, 1854, commanded by Lieutenant Colonel Robert C. Buchanan, a martinet officer, with whom Grant had earlier crossed paths at Jefferson Barracks. Separated from his wife and family, Grant began to drink. Colonel Buchanan reprimanded Grant for one drinking episode and told Grant to "resign or reform." Grant told Buchanan he would "resign if I don't reform." On Sunday, Grant was found influenced by alcohol, but not incapacitated, at his company's paytable. Keeping his pledge to Buchanan, Grant resigned, effective July 31, 1854. Buchanan endorsed Grant's letter of resignation but did not submit any report that verified the incident. Grant did not face court-martial, and the War Department said: "Nothing stands against his good name." Grant said years later, "the vice of intemperance (drunkenness) had not a little to do with my decision to resign." With no means of support, Grant returned to St. Louis and reunited with his family, uncertain about his future.

Civilian struggles, slavery, and politics

In 1854, at age 32, Grant entered civilian life, without any money-making vocation to support his growing family. It was the beginning of seven years of financial struggles, poverty, and instability. Grant's father offered him a place in the Galena, Illinois, branch of the family's leather business, but demanded Julia and the children stay in Missouri, with the Dents, or with the Grants in Kentucky. Grant and Julia declined the offer. Grant farmed (for the next four years), using Julia's slave Dan, on his brother-in-law's property, Wish-ton-wish, near St. Louis. The farm was not successful and to earn an alternate living he sold firewood on St. Louis street corners.

In 1856, the Grants moved to land on Julia's father's farm, and built a home called "Hardscrabble" on Grant's Farm. Julia described the rustic house as an "unattractive cabin", but made the dwelling as homelike as possible with the family's keepsakes and other belongings. Grant's family had little money, clothes, and furniture, but always had enough food. During the Panic of 1857, which devastated Grant as it did many farmers, Grant pawned his gold watch in order to buy Christmas gifts for his family. In 1858, Grant rented out Hardscrabble and moved his family to Julia's father's 850-acre plantation. That fall, after suffering from malaria, Grant finally gave up farming.

The same year, Grant acquired a slave from his father-in-law, a thirty-five-year-old man named William Jones. Although Grant was not an abolitionist, he was not considered a "slavery man", and could not bring himself to force a slave to do work. In March 1859, Grant freed William by a manumission deed, potentially worth at least $1,000, when Grant needed the money. Grant moved to St. Louis, taking on a partnership with Julia's cousin Harry Boggs working in the real estate business as a bill collector, again without success and with Julia's prompting ended the partnership. In August, Grant applied for a position as county engineer, believing his education qualified him for the job. He had thirty-five notable recommendations, but the position was given on the basis of political affiliation and Grant was passed over by the Free Soil and Republican county commissioners because he was believed to share his father-in-law's Democratic sentiments. In the 1856 presidential election, Grant cast his first presidential vote for Democrat James Buchanan, later saying he was really voting against Republican John C. Frémont over concern that his anti-slavery position would lead to southern secession and war and because he considered Frémont to be a shameless self-promoter.

In April 1860, Grant and his family moved north to Galena, accepting a position in his father's leather goods business run by his younger brothers Simpson and Orvil. In a few months, Grant paid off his debts. The family attended the local Methodist church and he soon established himself as a reputable citizen of Galena. For the 1860 election, he could not vote because he was not yet a legal resident of Illinois, but he favored Democrat Stephen A. Douglas over the eventual winner, Abraham Lincoln, and Lincoln over the Southern Democrat, John C. Breckinridge. He was torn between his increasingly anti-slavery views and the fact that his wife remained a staunch Democrat.

Civil War

On April 12, 1861, the American Civil War began when Confederate troops attacked Fort Sumter in Charleston, South Carolina. The news came as a shock in Galena, and Grant shared his neighbors' concern about the war. On April 15, Lincoln called for 75,000 volunteers. The next day, Grant attended a mass meeting to assess the crisis and encourage recruitment, and a speech by his father's attorney, John Aaron Rawlins, stirred Grant's patriotism. Ready to fight, Grant recalled with satisfaction, "I never went into our leather store again." On April 18, Grant chaired a second recruitment meeting, but turned down a captain's position as commander of the newly formed militia company, hoping his previous experience would aid him to obtain a more senior military rank.

Early commands

Grant's early efforts to be recommissioned were rejected by Major General George B. McClellan and Brigadier General Nathaniel Lyon. On April 29, supported by Congressman Elihu B. Washburne of Illinois, Grant was appointed military aide to Governor Richard Yates and mustered ten regiments into the Illinois militia. On June 14, again aided by Washburne, Grant was promoted to Colonel and put in charge of the unruly 21st Illinois Volunteer Infantry Regiment, which he soon restored to good order and discipline. Colonel Grant and his 21st Regiment were transferred to Missouri to dislodge Confederate forces.

On August 5, with Washburne's aid, Grant was appointed Brigadier General of volunteers. Major General John C. Frémont, Union commander of the West, passed over senior generals and appointed Grant commander of the District of Southeastern Missouri. On September 2, Grant arrived at Cairo, Illinois, assumed command by replacing Colonel Oglesby, and set up his headquarters to plan a campaign down the Mississippi, and up the Tennessee and Cumberland rivers. After the Confederates moved into western Kentucky, taking Columbus, with designs on southern Illinois, Grant, after notifying Frémont, and without waiting further for his reply, strategically advanced on Paducah, Kentucky, taking it without a fight on September 6. Having understood the importance to Lincoln about Kentucky's neutrality, Grant assured its citizens, "I have come among you not as your enemy, but as your friend." On November 1, Frémont ordered Grant to "make demonstrations" against the Confederates on both sides of the Mississippi, but prohibited him from attacking the enemy.

Belmont (1861), Forts Henry and Donelson (1862)

On November 2, 1861, Lincoln removed Frémont from command, freeing Grant to attack Confederate soldiers encamped in Cape Girardeau, Missouri. On November 5, Grant, along with Brigadier General John A. McClernand, landed 2,500 men at Hunter's Point, and on November 7 engaged the Confederates at the Battle of Belmont. The Union army took the camp, but the reinforced Confederates under Brigadier Generals Frank Cheatham and Gideon J. Pillow forced a chaotic Union retreat.  Grant had wanted to destroy Confederate strongholds at both Belmont, Missouri and Columbus, Kentucky, but was not given enough troops and was only able to disrupt their positions. Grant's troops fought their way back to their Union boats and escaped back to Cairo under fire from the fortified stronghold at Columbus.  Although Grant and his army retreated, the battle gave his volunteers much-needed confidence and experience. It also showed Lincoln that Grant was a general willing to fight.

Columbus blocked Union access to the lower Mississippi. Grant and lieutenant colonel James B. McPherson planned to bypass Columbus and with a force of 25,000 troops, move against Fort Henry on the Tennessee River. They would then march ten miles east to Fort Donelson on the Cumberland River, with the aid of gunboats, opening both rivers and allowing the Union access further south. Grant presented his plan to Henry Halleck, his new commander in the newly created Department of Missouri. Halleck was considering the same strategy, but rebuffed Grant, believing he needed twice the number of troops. However, after Halleck telegraphed and consulted McClellan about the plan, he finally agreed on the condition that the attack would be conducted in close cooperation with the navy Flag Officer, Andrew H. Foote.  Foote's gunboats bombarded Fort Henry, leading to its surrender on February 6, 1862, before Grant's infantry even arrived.

Grant then ordered an immediate assault on Fort Donelson, which dominated the Cumberland River. Fort Donelson, unlike Fort Henry, had a force equal to Grant's army. Unaware of the garrison's strength, Grant, McClernand, and Smith positioned their divisions around the fort. The next day McClernand and Smith independently launched probing attacks on apparent weak spots but were forced to retreat by the Confederates. On February 14, Foote's gunboats began bombarding the fort, only to be repulsed by its heavy guns. Seizing the initiative, the next day, Pillow fiercely attacked and routed one of Grant's divisions, McClernand's. Union reinforcements arrived, giving Grant a total force of over 40,000 men. Grant was with Foote, four miles away when the Confederates attacked. Hearing the battle noise, Grant rode back and rallied his troop commanders, riding over seven miles of freezing roads and trenches, exchanging reports. When Grant blocked the Nashville Road, the Confederates retreated back into Fort Donelson. On February 16, Foote resumed his bombardment, which signaled a general attack. Confederate generals John B. Floyd and Pillow fled, leaving the fort in command of Simon Bolivar Buckner, who submitted to Grant's demand for "unconditional and immediate surrender".

Grant had won the first major victory for the Union, capturing Floyd's entire rebel army of more than 12,000. Halleck was angry that Grant had acted without his authorization and complained to McClellan, accusing Grant of "neglect and inefficiency". On March 3, Halleck sent a telegram to Washington complaining that he had no communication with Grant for a week. Three days later, Halleck followed up with a postscript claiming "word has just reached me that ... Grant has resumed his bad habits (of drinking)." Lincoln, regardless, promoted Grant to major general of volunteers and the Northern press treated Grant as a hero. Playing off his initials, they took to calling him "Unconditional Surrender Grant".

Shiloh (1862) and aftermath

With great armies now massing, it was widely thought in the North that another western battle might end the war. Grant, reinstated by Halleck at the urging of Lincoln and Secretary of War Edwin Stanton, left Fort Henry and traveled by boat up the Tennessee River to rejoin his army with orders to advance with the Army of the Tennessee into Tennessee. Grant's main army was located at Pittsburg Landing, while 40,000 Confederate troops converged at Corinth, Mississippi. Brigadier General William Tecumseh Sherman assured Grant that his green troops were ready for an attack. Grant agreed and wired Halleck with their assessment. Grant wanted to attack the Confederates at Corinth, but Halleck ordered him not to attack until Major General Don Carlos Buell arrived with his division of 25,000. Meanwhile, Grant prepared for an attack on the Confederate army of roughly equal strength. Instead of preparing defensive fortifications between the Tennessee River and Owl Creek, and clearing fields of fire, they spent most of their time drilling the largely inexperienced troops while Sherman dismissed reports of nearby Confederates.

Union inaction created the opportunity for the Confederates to attack first before Buell arrived. On the morning of April 6, 1862, Grant's troops were taken by surprise when the Confederates, led by Generals Albert Sidney Johnston and P. G. T. Beauregard, struck first "like an Alpine avalanche" near Shiloh church, attacking five divisions of Grant's army and forcing a confused retreat toward the Tennessee River. Johnston was killed and command fell upon Beauregard. One Union line held the Confederate attack off for several hours at a place later called the "Hornet's Nest", giving Grant time to assemble artillery and 20,000 troops near Pittsburg Landing. The Confederates finally broke through the Hornet's Nest to capture a Union division, but "Grant's Last Line" held the landing, while the exhausted Confederates, lacking reinforcements, halted their advance. The day's fighting had been costly, with thousands of casualties. That evening, heavy rain set in. Sherman found Grant standing alone under a tree in the rain. "Well, Grant, we've had the devil's own day of it, haven't we?" Sherman said. "Yes," replied Grant. "Lick 'em tomorrow, though."

Bolstered by 18,000 fresh troops from the divisions of Major Generals Buell and Lew Wallace, Grant counterattacked at dawn the next day and regained the field, forcing the disorganized and demoralized rebels to retreat back to Corinth. Halleck ordered Grant not to advance more than one day's march from Pittsburg Landing, stopping the pursuit of the Confederate Army. Although Grant had won the battle the situation was little changed, with the Union in possession of Pittsburg Landing and the Confederates once again holed up in Corinth. Grant, now realizing that the South was determined to fight and that the war would not be won with one battle, would later write, "Then, indeed, I gave up all idea of saving the Union except by complete conquest."

Shiloh was the costliest battle in American history to that point and the staggering 23,746 total casualties stunned the nation. Briefly hailed a hero for routing the Confederates, Grant was soon mired in controversy. The Northern press castigated Grant for shockingly high casualties, and accused him of drunkenness during the battle, contrary to the accounts of officers and others with him at the time. Discouraged, Grant considered resigning but Sherman convinced him to stay. Lincoln dismissed Grant's critics, saying "I can't spare this man; he fights." Ultimately, Grant's costly victory at Shiloh ended any chance for the Confederates to prevail in the Mississippi valley or regain its strategic advantage in the West.

Halleck arrived from St. Louis on April 11, took command, and assembled a combined army of about 120,000 men. On April 29, he relieved Grant of field command and replaced him with Major General George Henry Thomas. Halleck slowly marched his army to take Corinth, entrenching each night. Meanwhile, Beauregard pretended to be reinforcing, sent "deserters" to the Union Army with that story, and moved his army out during the night, to Halleck's surprise when he finally arrived at Corinth on May 30.

Halleck divided his combined army and reinstated Grant as field commander of the Army of the Tennessee on July 11.

Later that year, on September 19, Grant's army defeated Confederates at the Battle of Iuka, then successfully defended Corinth, inflicting heavy casualties. On October 25, Grant assumed command of the District of the Tennessee. In November, after Lincoln's preliminary Emancipation Proclamation, Grant ordered units under his command to incorporate former slaves into the Union Army, giving them clothes, shelter, and wages for their services. Grant held western Tennessee with almost 40,000 men.

Vicksburg campaign (1862–1863)

The Union capture of Vicksburg, the last Confederate stronghold on the Mississippi River, was vital, and would split the Confederacy in two. Lincoln, however, appointed McClernand for the job, rather than Grant or Sherman. Halleck, who retained power over troop displacement, ordered McClernand to Memphis, and placed him and his troops under Grant's authority. On November 13, 1862, Grant captured Holly Springs and advanced to Corinth. Grant's plan was to march south to Jackson, and attack Vicksburg overland, while Sherman would attack Vicksburg from Chickasaw Bayou. However, Confederate cavalry raids on December 11 and 20, 1862, broke Union communications and recaptured Holly Springs, preventing Grant and Sherman from converging on Vicksburg. Grant observed sabotage by civilians who had feigned loyalty and complained: "Guerrillas are hovering around in every direction." On December 29, a Confederate army led by Lieutenant General John C. Pemberton repulsed Sherman's direct approach ascending the bluffs to Vicksburg at Chickasaw Bayou. McClernand reached Sherman's army, assumed command, and independently of Grant led a campaign that captured Confederate Fort Hindman.

Contraband fugitive African-American slaves poured into Grant's district, whom he sent north to Cairo, to be integrated into white society as domestic servants in Chicago. However, Lincoln ended this move when Illinois political leaders complained. On his own initiative, Grant set up a pragmatic program and hired a young Presbyterian Chaplain John Eaton to administer slave refuge work camps. Compensated contraband freed slaves would be used to pick cotton that would be shipped north and sent to aid the Union war effort. Lincoln approved and Grant's camp program was successful. Grant also worked freed black labor on the bypass canal and other points on the river, incorporating them into the Union Army and Navy.

Grant's war responsibilities included combating an illegal Northern cotton trade and civilian obstruction. Smuggling of cotton was rampant, while the price of cotton skyrocketed. Grant believed the smuggling funded the Confederacy and provided them with military intelligence, while Union soldiers were dying in the fields. He had received numerous dispatches with complaints about Jewish speculators in his district. He also feared the trading corrupted many of his officers who were also eager to make a profit on a bale of cotton, while the majority of those involved in illegal trading was not Jewish. Outraged that gold paid for southern cotton, Grant required two permits, one from the Treasury and one from the Union Army, to purchase cotton.

On December 17, 1862, Grant issued a controversial General Order No. 11, expelling "Jews, as a class", from his Union Army military district. The order was fully enforced at Holly Springs (December 17) and Paducah (December 28). Confederate General Van Dorn's raid on Holly Springs (December 20), prevented many Jewish people from potential expulsion. After complaints, Lincoln rescinded the order on January 3, 1863. Grant finally stopped the order within three weeks on January 17.

On January 29, 1863, Grant assumed overall command. Eventually, he attempted to advance his army through water-logged terrain to bypass Vicksburg's guns. The plan of attacking Vicksburg from downriver carried great risk because upon crossing the Mississippi River, his army would be beyond the reach of most of its supply lines. On April 16, Grant ordered Admiral David Dixon Porter's gunboats south under fire from the Vicksburg batteries to meet up with troops who had marched south down the west side of the river. Grant ordered diversionary battles, confusing Pemberton and allowing Grant's army to move east across the Mississippi, landing troops at Bruinsburg. Grant's army captured Jackson, the state capital. Advancing west, Grant defeated Pemberton's army at the Battle of Champion Hill on May 16, forcing their retreat into Vicksburg. After Grant's men assaulted the entrenchments twice, suffering severe losses, they settled in for a siege lasting seven weeks. During quiet periods of the campaign, Grant would take to drinking on occasion. The personal rivalry between McClernand and Grant continued until Grant removed him from command when he contravened Grant by publishing an order without permission. Pemberton surrendered Vicksburg to Grant on July 4, 1863.

Vicksburg's fall gave Union forces control of the Mississippi River and split the Confederacy. By that time, Grant's political sympathies fully coincided with the Radical Republicans' aggressive prosecution of the war and emancipation of the slaves. The success at Vicksburg was a morale boost for the Union war effort. When Stanton suggested Grant be brought east to run the Army of the Potomac, Grant demurred, writing that he knew the geography and resources of the West better and he did not want to upset the chain of command in the East.

Chattanooga (1863) and promotion

Lincoln promoted Grant to major general in the regular army (as opposed to the volunteers) and assigned him command of the newly formed Division of the Mississippi on October 16, 1863, comprising the Armies of the Ohio, the Tennessee, and the Cumberland. After the Battle of Chickamauga, the Army of the Cumberland retreated into Chattanooga where they were partially besieged. Grant arrived in Chattanooga on horseback, after a journey by boat from Vicksburg to Cairo, and then by train to Bridgeport, Alabama. Plans to resupply the city and break the partial siege had already been set on foot before his arrival. Forces commanded by Major General Joseph Hooker, which had been sent from the Army of the Potomac, approached from the west and linked up with other units moving east from inside the city, capturing Brown's Ferry and opening a supply line to the railroad at Bridgeport.

Grant planned to have Sherman's Army of the Tennessee, assisted by the Army of the Cumberland, assault the northern end of Missionary Ridge, preparatory to rolling down it on the enemy's right flank. On November 23, Major General George Henry Thomas surprised the enemy in open daylight, advancing the Union lines and taking Orchard Knob, between Chattanooga and the ridge. The next day, Sherman failed to achieve his mission of getting atop Missionary Ridge, which was the key to Grant's plan of battle. Hooker's forces took Lookout Mountain using an ingenious maneuver to flank the enemy, in unexpected success. On the 25th, Grant ordered Major General George Henry Thomas to advance to the rifle-pits at the case of Missionary in an effort to help Sherman, after Sherman's army failed to take Missionary Ridge from the northeast. Four divisions of the Army of the Cumberland, with the center two led by Major General Philip Sheridan and Brigadier General Thomas J. Wood, chased the Confederates out of the rifle-pits at the base and, against orders, continued the charge up the 45-degree slope and captured the Confederate entrenchments along the crest, forcing a hurried retreat. The decisive battle gave the Union control of Tennessee and opened Georgia, the Confederate heartland, to Union invasion. Grant was given an enormous thoroughbred horse, Cincinnati, by a thankful admirer in St. Louis.

On March 2, 1864, Lincoln promoted Grant to lieutenant general, giving him command of all Union Armies. Grant's new rank had only previously been held by George Washington. Grant arrived in Washington on March 8, and he was formally commissioned by Lincoln the next day at a Cabinet meeting. Grant developed a good working relationship with Lincoln, who allowed Grant to devise his own strategy. Grant established his headquarters with General George Meade's Army of the Potomac in Culpeper, north-west of Richmond, and met weekly with Lincoln and Stanton in Washington. After protest from Halleck, Grant scrapped a risky invasion plan of North Carolina, and adopted a plan of five coordinated Union offensives on five fronts, so Confederate armies could not shift troops along interior lines. Grant and Meade would make a direct frontal attack on Robert E. Lee's Army of Northern Virginia, while Sherman—now chief of the western armies—was to destroy Joseph E. Johnston's Army of Tennessee and take Atlanta. Major General Benjamin Butler would advance on Lee from the southeast, up the James River, while Major General Nathaniel Banks would capture Mobile. Major General Franz Sigel was to capture granaries and rail lines in the fertile Shenandoah Valley.

Grant now commanded in total 533,000 battle-ready troops spread out over an eighteen-mile front, while the Confederates had lost many officers in battle and had great difficulty finding replacements. He was popular, and there was talk that a Union victory early in the year could lead to his candidacy for the presidency. Grant was aware of the rumors, but had ruled out a political candidacy; the possibility would soon vanish with delays on the battlefield.

Overland Campaign (1864)

The Overland Campaign was a series of brutal battles fought in Virginia for seven weeks during May and June 1864. Sigel's and Butler's efforts failed, and Grant was left alone to fight Lee. On the morning of Wednesday, May 4, Grant dressed in full uniform, sword at his side, led the army out from his headquarters at Culpeper towards Germanna Ford. They crossed the Rapidan unopposed, while supplies were transported on four pontoon bridges. On May 5, the Union army attacked Lee in the Wilderness, a three-day battle with estimated casualties of 17,666 Union and 11,125 Confederate.

Rather than retreat, Grant flanked Lee's army to the southeast and attempted to wedge his forces between Lee and Richmond at Spotsylvania Court House. Lee's army got to Spotsylvania first and a costly battle ensued, lasting thirteen days, with heavy casualties. On May 12, Grant attempted to break through Lee's Muleshoe salient guarded by Confederate artillery, resulting in one of the bloodiest assaults of the Civil War, known as the Bloody Angle. Unable to break Lee's lines, Grant again flanked the rebels to the southeast, meeting at North Anna, where a battle lasted three days.

Cold Harbor

Grant believed breaking through Lee's lines at its weakest point, Cold Harbor, a vital road hub that linked to Richmond, would mean the destruction of Lee's army, the capture of Richmond, and a quick end to the rebellion. Grant already had two corps in position at Cold Harbor with Hancock's corps on the way. The recent bloody Wilderness campaign had severely diminished Confederate morale and hence Grant was now willing to advance on Lee's army once again.

Lee's lines were extended north and east of Richmond and Petersburg for approximately ten miles, but there were several points where there were no fortifications built yet, and Cold Harbor was one of them. On June 1 and 2 both Grant and Lee were still waiting for reinforcements to arrive. Hancock's men had marched all night and arrived too exhausted for an immediate attack that morning. Grant agreed to let the men rest and postponed the attack until 5 p.m., and then again until 4:30 a.m. on June 3. However, Grant and Meade did not give specific orders for the attack, leaving it up to the corps commanders to decide where they would coordinate and attack the Confederate lines, as no senior commander had yet reconnoitered the latest Confederate developments. Grant had not yet learned that overnight Lee had hastily constructed entrenchments to thwart any breach attempt at Cold Harbor. Grant had put off making an attack twice and was anxious to make his move before the rest of Lee's army arrived. On the morning of June 3, the third day of the thirteen-day battle, with a force of more than 100,000 men, against Lee's 59,000, Grant attacked not realizing that Lee's army was now well entrenched, much of it obscured by trees and bushes. Grant's army suffered 12,000–14,000 casualties, while Lee's army suffered 3,000–5,000 casualties, but Lee was less able to replace them.

The unprecedented number of casualties was shocking by all accounts and heightened anti-war sentiment in the North. After the battle Grant wanted to appeal to Lee under the white flag for each side to gather up their wounded, most of them Union soldiers, but Lee insisted that a total truce be enacted and while they were deliberating all but a few of the wounded died in the field. Without giving an apology for the disastrous defeat in his official military report, Grant confided in his staff after the battle and years later wrote in his memoirs that he "regretted that the last assault at Cold Harbor was ever made. I might say the same thing of the assault ... at Vicksburg."

Siege of Petersburg (1864–1865)

Undetected by Lee, Grant moved his army south of the James River, freed Butler from the Bermuda Hundred, and advanced toward Petersburg, Virginia's central railroad hub. Beauregard defended Petersburg, and Lee's veteran reinforcements arrived on June 18, resulting in a nine-month siege. Northern resentment grew. Sheridan was assigned command of the Union Army of the Shenandoah and Grant directed him to "follow the enemy to their death" in the Shenandoah Valley. When Sheridan suffered attacks by John S. Mosby's irregular Confederate cavalry, Grant recommended rounding up their families for imprisonment at Fort McHenry. After Grant's abortive attempt to capture Petersburg, Lincoln supported Grant in his decision to continue and visited Grant's headquarters at City Point on June 21 to assess the state of the army and meet with Grant and Admiral Porter. By the time Lincoln departed his appreciation for Grant had grown.

To strike at Lee in a timely capacity Grant was forced to use what resources were immediately available, and they were diminishing by the day. Grant had to commit badly needed troops to check Confederate General Jubal Early's raids in the Shenandoah Valley and who was getting dangerously close to the Potomac River, and Washington. By late July, at Petersburg, Grant reluctantly approved a plan to blow up part of the enemy trenches from a tunnel filled with many tons of gunpowder. The massive explosion created a crater, 170 feet across and 30 feet deep, killing an entire Confederate regiment in an instant. The poorly led Union troops under Major General Burnside and Brigadier General Ledlie, rather than encircling the crater, rushed forward and poured directly into it, which was widely deemed a mistake. Recovering from the surprise, Confederates, led by Major General William Mahone, surrounded the crater and easily picked off Union troops within it. The Union's 3,500 casualties outnumbered the Confederates' by three-to-one. The battle marked the first time that Union black troops, who endured a large proportion of the casualties, engaged in any major battle in the east. Grant admitted that the overall mining tactic had been a "stupendous failure".

Grant would later meet with Lincoln and testify at a court of inquiry against Generals Burnside and Ledlie for their incompetence. In his memoirs he blamed both of them for that disastrous Union defeat. Rather than fight Lee in a full-frontal attack as he had done at Cold Harbor, Grant continued to force Lee to extend his defenses south and west of Petersburg, better allowing him to capture essential railroad links.

Union forces soon captured Mobile Bay and Atlanta and now controlled the Shenandoah Valley, ensuring Lincoln's reelection in November. Sherman convinced Grant and Lincoln to send his army to march on Savannah. Sherman cut a 60-mile path of destruction unopposed, reached the Atlantic Ocean, and captured Savannah on December 22. On December 16, after much prodding by Grant, the Union Army under Thomas smashed John Bell Hood's Confederate Army at Nashville. These campaigns left Lee's forces at Petersburg as the only significant obstacle remaining to Union victory.

By March 1865, Lee was trapped, Grant had severely weakened Lee's strength, having extended his lines to 35 miles. Confederate troops no longer confident of their commander, deserted Lee by the thousands, starving and under the duress of trench warfare.  On March 25, in a desperate effort, Lee sacrificed his remaining troops (4,000 CSA casualties) at Fort Stedman, a Union victory, and considered the last Petersburg line battle. Grant, Sherman, Porter, and Lincoln held a conference to discuss the surrender of Lee's Confederate depleted armies and Reconstruction of the South on March 28.

Defeated Lee and victory (1865)

On April 2, Grant ordered a general assault on Lee's entrenched depleted forces. Lee abandoned Petersburg and Richmond, while Grant's conquering Union troops easily took Petersburg and captured Richmond the next day. A desperate Lee, and part of his army cut and ran, attempted to link up with the remnants of Joseph E. Johnston's defeated army. Sheridan's cavalry, however, stopped the two armies from converging, cutting them off from their supply trains. Grant was in communication with Lee before he entrusted his aide Orville Babcock to carry his last dispatch to Lee that demanded his surrender with instructions to escort him to a meeting place of Lee's choosing. Grant immediately rode west, bypassing Lee's army, to join Sheridan who had captured Appomattox Station, blocking Lee's escape route. On his way, Grant received a letter sent by Lee informing him Lee would surrender his army.

On April 9, Grant and Lee met at Appomattox Court House. Upon receiving Lee's dispatch about the proposed meeting Grant had been jubilant. Although Grant felt depressed at the fall of "a foe who had fought so long and valiantly," he believed the Southern cause was "one of the worst for which a people ever fought." After briefly discussing their days of old in Mexico, Grant wrote out the terms of surrender. Men and officers were to be paroled, but in addition, there was amnesty: "Each officer and man will be allowed to return to his home, not to be disturbed by U.S. authority so long as they observe their paroles and the laws in force where they may reside." Lee immediately accepted Grant's terms and signed the surrender document, without any diplomatic recognition of the Confederacy. The vanquished Lee, afterward asked Grant that his former Confederate troops keep their horses. Grant generously allowed Lee's request. Grant ordered his troops to stop all celebration, saying the "war is over; the rebels are our countrymen again." Johnston's Tennessee army surrendered on April 26, 1865, Richard Taylor's Alabama army on May 4, and Kirby Smith's Texas army on May 26, ending the war.

Lincoln's assassination

On April 14, 1865, five days after Grant's victory at Appomattox, he attended a cabinet meeting in Washington. Lincoln invited him and his wife Julia to Ford's Theatre but they declined, because they had plans to travel to their home in Burlington. In a conspiracy that also targeted top cabinet members in one last effort to topple the Union, Lincoln was fatally shot by John Wilkes Booth at the theater and died the next morning. Many, including Grant himself, thought that he, Grant, had been a target in the plot, and during the subsequent trial, the government tried to prove that Grant had been stalked by Booth's conspirator Michael O'Laughlen. Stanton notified Grant of the President's death and summoned him back to Washington. Vice President Andrew Johnson was sworn in as president on April 15. Attending Lincoln's funeral on April 19, Grant stood alone and wept openly; he later said Lincoln was "the greatest man I have ever known". Grant was determined to work with Johnson, and he privately expressed "every reason to hope" in the new president's ability to run the government "in its old channel".

Commanding General

At the war's end, Grant remained commander of the army, with duties that included dealing with Maximilian and French troops in Mexico, enforcement of Reconstruction in the former Confederate states, and supervision of Indian wars on the western Plains. After the Grand Review of the Armies, Lee and his generals were indicted for treason in Virginia. Johnson demanded they be put on trial, but Grant insisted that they should not be tried, citing his Appomatox amnesty. Johnson backed down, so charges against Lee were dropped. Grant secured a house for his family in Georgetown Heights in 1865 but instructed Elihu Washburne that for political purposes his legal residence remained in Galena, Illinois. That same year, Grant spoke at Cooper Union in New York in support of Johnson's presidency. Further travels that summer took the Grants to Albany, New York, back to Galena, and throughout Illinois and Ohio, with enthusiastic receptions. On July 25, 1866, Congress promoted Grant to the newly created rank of General of the Army of the United States.

Saved Lee's life
On June 7, 1865, Robert E. Lee, and other former Confederate officers were indicted by a grand jury for the high crime of treason against the United States, a capital offense punished by imprisonment and hanging. Johnson wanted to punish Lee, and "make treason odious". When informed, Grant objected and went to the White House telling President Johnson that Lee was protected by Grant's surrender terms Grant had generously given Lee at Appomattox in April. When an angered Grant threatened to resign, President Johnson backed down, and on June 20, Johnson's Attorney General James Speed ordered the United States Attorney General in Norfolk, Virginia to drop treason proceedings against Lee, saving Lee from punishment and prosecution.

Tour of the South

President Johnson's Reconstruction policy included a speedy return of the former Confederates to Congress, reinstating whites to office in the South, and relegating blacks to second-class citizenship. On November 27, 1865, General Grant left Washington, sent by Johnson on a fact-finding mission to the South, to counter a pending less favorable report by Senator Carl Schurz. Grant recommended continuation of the Freedmen's Bureau, which Johnson opposed, but advised against using black troops, which he believed encouraged an alternative to farm labor. Grant did not believe the people of the South were ready for self-rule, and that both whites and blacks in the South required protection by the federal government. Concerned that the war led to diminished respect for civil authorities, Grant continued using the Army to maintain order. Grant's report on the South, which he later recanted, sympathized with Johnson's conservative Reconstruction policies. Although Grant desired former Confederates be returned to Congress, he advocated eventual black citizenship. On December 19, the day after the passage of the Thirteenth Amendment was announced in the Senate, Johnson's response used Grant's report, read aloud to the Senate, to undermine Schurz's final report and Radical opposition to Johnson's policies.

Break from Johnson
Grant was initially optimistic about Johnson, saying he was satisfied the nation had "nothing to fear" from the Johnson administration. Despite differing styles, Grant got along cordially with Johnson and attended cabinet meetings concerning Reconstruction. By February 1866, the relationship began to break down. Johnson opposed Grant's closure of the Richmond Examiner for disloyal editorials and his enforcement of the Civil Rights Act of 1866, passed over Johnson's veto. Needing Grant's popularity, Johnson took Grant on his "Swing Around the Circle" tour, a failed attempt to gain national support for lenient policies toward the South. Grant privately called Johnson's speeches a "national disgrace" and he left the tour early. On March 2, 1867, overriding Johnson's veto, Congress passed the first of three Reconstruction Acts, using military officers to enforce the policy. Protecting Grant, Congress passed the Command of the Army Act, preventing his removal or relocation, and forcing Johnson to pass orders through Grant.

In August 1867, bypassing the Tenure of Office Act, Johnson discharged Secretary of War Stanton without Senate approval and appointed Grant ad interim Secretary of War. Stanton was the only remaining cabinet member friendly to the Radicals. Although Grant initially recommended against dismissing Stanton, Grant accepted the position, not wanting the Army to fall under a conservative appointee who would impede Reconstruction, and managed an uneasy partnership with Johnson. In December 1867, Congress voted to keep Stanton, who was reinstated by a Senate Committee on Friday, January 10, 1868. Grant told Johnson he was going to resign the office to avoid fines and imprisonment. Johnson, who believed the law would be overturned, said he would assume Grant's legal responsibility, and reminded Grant that he had promised him to delay his resignation until a suitable replacement was found. The following Monday, not willing to wait for the law to be overturned, Grant surrendered the office to Stanton, causing confusion with Johnson. With the complete backing of his cabinet, Johnson personally accused Grant of lying and "duplicity" at a stormy cabinet meeting, while a shocked and disappointed Grant felt it was Johnson who was lying. The publication of angry messages between Grant and Johnson led to a complete break between the two. The controversy led to Johnson's impeachment and trial in the Senate. Johnson was saved from removal from office by one vote. Grant's popularity rose among the Radical Republicans and his nomination for the presidency appeared certain.

Election of 1868

When the Republican Party met at the 1868 Republican National Convention in Chicago, the delegates unanimously nominated Grant for president and Speaker of the House Schuyler Colfax for vice president. Although Grant had preferred to remain in the army, he accepted the Republican nomination, believing that he was the only one who could unify the nation. The Republicans advocated "equal civil and political rights to all" and African American enfranchisement. The Democrats, having abandoned Johnson, nominated former governor Horatio Seymour of New York for president and Francis P. Blair of Missouri for vice president. The Democrats opposed suffrage for African Americans and advocated the immediate restoration of former Confederate states to the Union and amnesty from "all past political offenses".

Grant played no overt role during the campaign and instead was joined by Sherman and Sheridan in a tour of the West that summer. However, the Republicans adopted his words "Let us have peace" as their campaign slogan. Grant's 1862 General Order No. 11 became an issue during the presidential campaign; he sought to distance himself from the order, saying "I have no prejudice against sect or race, but want each individual to be judged by his own merit." The Democrats and their Klan supporters focused mainly on ending Reconstruction, intimidating blacks and Republicans, and returning control of the South to the white Democrats and the planter class, alienating War Democrats in the North. An example was the murder of Republican Congressman James M. Hinds in Arkansas by a Klansman in October 1868, as Hinds campaigned for Grant. Grant won the popular vote by 300,000 votes out of 5,716,082 votes cast, receiving an Electoral College landslide of 214 votes to Seymour's 80. Seymour received a majority of white voters, but Grant was aided by 500,000 votes cast by blacks, winning him 52.7 percent of the popular vote. He lost Louisiana and Georgia, primarily due to Ku Klux Klan violence against African-American voters. At the age of 46, Grant was the youngest president yet elected, and the first president after the nation had outlawed slavery.

Presidency (1869–1877)

On March 4, 1869, Grant was sworn in as the eighteenth President of the United States by Chief Justice Salmon P. Chase. In his inaugural address, Grant urged the ratification of the Fifteenth Amendment, while large numbers of African Americans attended his inauguration. He also urged that bonds issued during the Civil War should be paid in gold, called for "proper treatment" of Native Americans and encouraged their "civilization and ultimate citizenship".

Grant's cabinet appointments sparked both criticism and approval. He appointed Elihu B. Washburne Secretary of State and John A. Rawlins Secretary of War. Washburne resigned, and Grant appointed him Minister to France. Grant then appointed former New York Senator Hamilton Fish Secretary of State. Rawlins died in office, and Grant appointed William W. Belknap Secretary of War. Grant appointed New York businessman Alexander T. Stewart Secretary of Treasury, but Stewart was found legally ineligible to hold office by a 1789 law. Grant then appointed Massachusetts Representative George S. Boutwell Secretary of Treasury. Philadelphia businessman Adolph E. Borie was appointed Secretary of Navy, but found the job stressful and resigned. Grant then appointed New Jersey's attorney general, George M. Robeson, Secretary of Navy. Former Ohio Governor Jacob D. Cox (Interior), former Maryland Senator John Creswell (Postmaster-General), and Ebenezer Rockwood Hoar (Attorney General) rounded out the cabinet.

Grant nominated Sherman to succeed him as general-in-chief and gave him control over war bureau chiefs. When Rawlins took over the War Department he complained to Grant that Sherman was given too much authority. Grant reluctantly revoked his own order, upsetting Sherman and damaging their wartime friendship. James Longstreet, a former Confederate general who had endorsed Grant's nomination, was nominated for the position of Surveyor of Customs of the port of New Orleans; this was met with general amazement, and seen as a genuine effort to unite the North and South. In March 1872, Grant signed legislation that established Yellowstone National Park, the first national park. Grant was sympathetic to women's rights; including support of female suffrage, saying he wanted "equal rights to all citizens".

To make up for his infamous General Order No. 11, Grant appointed more than fifty Jewish people to federal office, including consuls, district attorneys, and deputy postmasters. He appointed Edward S. Salomon territorial governor of Washington, the first time an American Jewish man occupied a governor's seat. Grant was sympathetic to the plight of persecuted Jewish people. In November 1869, reports surfaced of the Russian Tsar Alexander II penalizing 2,000 Jewish families for smuggling by expelling them to the interior of the country. In response, Grant publicly supported the Jewish American B'nai B'rith petition against the Tsar. In December 1869, Grant appointed a Jewish journalist as Consul to Romania, to protect Jewish people there from "severe oppression".

In 1875, Grant proposed a constitutional amendment that limited religious indoctrination in public schools. Instruction of "religious, atheistic, or pagan tenets", would be banned, while funding "for the benefit or in aid, directly or indirectly, of any religious sect or denomination", would be prohibited. Schools would be for all children "irrespective of sex, color, birthplace, or religions". Grant's views were incorporated into the Blaine Amendment, but it was defeated by the Senate.

In October 1871, under the Morrill Act, Grant rounded up and prosecuted hundreds of Utah Territory Mormon polygamists, using federal marshals, including Mormon leader Brigham Young, indicted for "lewd and lascivious cohabitation". Grant had called polygamy a "crime against decency and morality". In 1874, Grant signed into law the Poland Act, that put Mormon polygamists under the U.S. District Courts, and limited Mormons on juries.  Beginning in March 1873, under the Comstock Act, Grant prosecuted, through the Postal Department, immoral and indecent pornographers, in addition to abortionists. To administer the prosecutions, Grant put in charge a vigorous moral leader and reformer Anthony Comstock. Comstock headed a federal commission and was empowered to seize and destroy obscene material and hand out arrest warrants to offenders of the law.

Reconstruction

Grant was considered an effective civil rights president, concerned about the plight of African Americans. On March 18, 1869, Grant signed into law equal rights for blacks, to serve on juries and hold office, in Washington D.C., and in 1870 he signed into law the Naturalization Act that gave foreign blacks citizenship. During his first term, Reconstruction took precedence. Republicans controlled most Southern states, propped up by Republican-controlled Congress, northern money, and southern military occupation. Grant advocated the ratification of the Fifteenth Amendment that said states could not disenfranchise African Americans. Within a year, the three remaining states—Mississippi, Virginia, and Texas—adopted the new amendment—and were admitted to Congress. Grant put military pressure on Georgia to reinstate its black legislators and adopt the new amendment. Georgia complied, and on February 24, 1871, its senators were seated in Congress, with all the former Confederate states represented, the Union was completely restored under Grant. Under Grant, for the first time in American history, Black-American males served in the United States Congress, all from the Southern states.

In 1870, to enforce Reconstruction, Congress and Grant created the Justice Department that allowed the Attorney General and the new Solicitor General to prosecute the Klan. Congress and Grant passed a series of three Enforcement Acts, designed to protect blacks and Reconstruction governments. Using the powers of the Enforcement Acts, Grant crushed the Ku Klux Klan. By October, Grant suspended habeas corpus in part of South Carolina and sent federal troops to help marshals, who initiated prosecutions. Grant's Attorney General, Amos T. Akerman, who replaced Hoar, was zealous to destroy the Klan. Akerman and South Carolina's U.S. marshal arrested over 470 Klan members, while hundreds of Klansmen, including the wealthy leaders, fled the state. By 1872 the Klan's power had collapsed, and African Americans voted in record numbers in elections in the South. Attorney General George H. Williams, Akerman's replacement, in the Spring of 1873, suspended prosecutions of the Klan in North Carolina and South Carolina, but prior to the election of 1874, he changed course and prosecuted the Klan.

During Grant's second term, the North retreated from Reconstruction, while southern conservative whites called "Redeemers" formed armed groups, the Red Shirts and the White League, who openly used violence, intimidation, voter fraud, and racist appeals to overturn Republican rule. Northern apathy toward blacks, the depressed economy and Grant's scandals made it politically difficult for the Grant administration to maintain support for Reconstruction. Power shifted when the House was taken over by the Democrats in the election of 1874. Grant ended the Brooks–Baxter War, bringing Reconstruction in Arkansas to a peaceful conclusion. He sent troops to New Orleans in the wake of the Colfax massacre and disputes over the election of Governor William Pitt Kellogg. Grant recalled Sheridan and most of the federal troops from Louisiana.

By 1875, Redeemer Democrats had taken control of all but three Southern states. As violence against black Southerners escalated once more, Grant's Attorney General Edwards Pierrepont told Republican Governor Adelbert Ames of Mississippi that the people were "tired of the autumnal outbreaks in the South", and declined to intervene directly, instead of sending an emissary to negotiate a peaceful election. Grant later regretted not issuing a proclamation to help Ames, having been told Republicans in Ohio would bolt the party if Grant intervened in Mississippi. Grant told Congress in January 1875 he could not "see with indifference Union men or Republicans ostracized, persecuted, and murdered." Congress refused to strengthen the laws against violence but instead passed a sweeping law to guarantee blacks access to public facilities. Grant signed it as the Civil Rights Act of 1875, but there was little enforcement and the Supreme Court ruled the law unconstitutional in 1883. In October 1876, Grant dispatched troops to South Carolina to keep Republican Governor Daniel Henry Chamberlain in office.

After Grant left office in 1877, the nation returned to compromise. Grant's Republican successor, President Rutherford B. Hayes, was conciliatory toward the South and favored "local control" of civil rights on the condition that Democrats make an honorary pledge to confirm the constitutional amendments that protected blacks. During Republican negotiations with Democrats, that Grant took no direct part in, the Republicans received the White House for Hayes in return for ending enforcement of racial equality for blacks and removing federal troops from the last three states. As promised, Hayes withdrew federal troops from South Carolina and Louisiana, which marked the end of Reconstruction.

Financial affairs

Soon after taking office, Grant took conservative steps to return the nation's currency to a more secure footing. During the Civil War, Congress had authorized the Treasury to issue banknotes that, unlike the rest of the currency, were not backed by gold or silver. The "greenback" notes, as they were known, were necessary to pay the unprecedented war debts, but they also caused inflation and forced gold-backed money out of circulation; Grant was determined to return the national economy to pre-war monetary standards. On March 18, 1869, he signed the Public Credit Act of 1869 that guaranteed bondholders would be repaid in "coin or its equivalent", while greenbacks would gradually be redeemed by the Treasury and replaced by notes backed by specie. The act committed the government to the full return of the gold standard within ten years. This followed a policy of "hard currency, economy and gradual reduction of the national debt." Grant's own ideas about the economy were simple, and he relied on the advice of wealthy and financially successful businessmen that he courted.

Gold corner conspiracy

In April 1869, two railroad tycoons Jay Gould and Jim Fisk conspired a plot to corner the gold market in New York, the nation's financial capital. They both controlled the Erie Railroad, and a high price of gold would allow foreign agriculture buyers to purchase exported crops, shipped east over the Erie's routes. Boutwell's bi-weekly policy of selling gold from the Treasury, however, kept gold artificially low. Unable to corrupt Boutwell, the two schemers built a relationship with Grant's brother-in-law, Abel Corbin, and gained access to Grant. Gould bribed Assistant Treasurer Daniel Butterfield $10,000 to gain insider information into the Treasury. Gould and Fisk personally lobbied Grant onboard their private yacht from New York to Boston, in mid-June 1869 to influence Grant's gold policy.

In July, Grant reduced the sale of Treasury gold to $2,000,000 per month and subsequent months. Fisk played a role in August in New York, having a letter from Gould, he told Grant his gold policy would destroy the nation. By September, Grant, who was naive in matters of finance, was convinced that a low gold price would help farmers, and the sale of gold for September was not increased. On September 23, when the gold price reached , Boutwell rushed to the White House and talked with Grant. The following day, September 24, known as Black Friday, Grant ordered Boutwell to sell, whereupon Boutwell wired Butterfield in New York, to sell $4,000,000 in gold. By January 1870, the economy resumed its post-war recovery.

Foreign affairs

Grant had limited foreign policy experience, acquired during his service in the Mexican-American war. Grant relied heavily on his talented Secretary of State Hamilton Fish. Fundamentally, Grant had an expansionist impulse to protect American interests abroad and was a strong advocate of the Monroe Doctrine. Grant and Fish had a reserved but cordial friendship. There were no foreign-policy disasters and no wars to engage in. Besides Grant himself, the main players in foreign affairs were Secretary Fish and the chairman of the Senate Foreign Relations Committee Charles Sumner. They had to cooperate to get a treaty ratified. Sumner, who hated Grant, led the opposition to Grant's plan to annex Santo Domingo. Sumner previously had hypocritically fully supported the annexation of Alaska.  In 1871, a U.S. expedition to Korea failed to open up trade and ended with an American military victory at the battle of Ganghwa-do.

Grant had an idealist side to his foreign policy. Grant appointed a Jewish lawyer, Benjamin F. Peixotto, U.S. Consul in Bucharest, in response to the Romanian persecution of Jews. Grant said that respect "for human rights is the first duty for those set as rulers" over the nations.

Treaty of Washington (1871)

The most pressing diplomatic problem in 1869 was the settlement of the Alabama claims, depredations caused to the Union by the Confederate warship , built in a British shipyard in violation of neutrality rules. Secretary Hamilton Fish played the central role in formulating and implementing the Treaty of Washington and the Geneva arbitration (1872). Senator Charles Sumner, Chairman of the Senate Foreign Relations Committee led the demand for reparations, with talk of British Columbia as payment. Fish and Treasurer George Boutwell convinced Grant that peaceful relations with Britain were essential, and the two nations agreed to negotiate along those lines.

To avoid jeopardizing negotiations, Grant refrained from recognizing Cuban rebels who were fighting for independence from Spain, which would have been inconsistent with American objections to the British granting belligerent status to Confederates. A commission in Washington produced a treaty whereby an international tribunal would settle the damage amounts; the British admitted regret, but not fault. The Senate, including Grant critics Sumner and Carl Schurz, approved the Treaty of Washington, which settled disputes over fishing rights and maritime boundaries, by a 50–12 vote, signed on May 8, 1871. The Alabama claims settlement would be Grant's most successful foreign policy achievement that secured peace with Great Britain and the United States. The settlement ($15,500,000) of the Alabama Claims resolved troubled Anglo-American issues, ended the bullied demand to take over Canada, and turned Britain into America's strongest ally.

Santo Domingo (Dominican Republic) 

In 1869, Grant initiated his plan, later to become an obsession, to annex the Dominican Republic, then called Santo Domingo. Grant believed acquisition of the Caribbean island and Samaná Bay would increase the United States' natural resources, and strengthen U.S. naval protection to enforce the Monroe Doctrine, safeguard against British obstruction of U.S. shipping and protect a future oceanic canal, stop slavery in Cuba and Brazil, while blacks in the United States would have a safe haven from "the crime of Klu Kluxism".

Joseph W. Fabens, an American speculator who represented Buenaventura Báez, the president of the Dominican Republic, met with Secretary Fish and proposed annexation, whose island inhabitants sought American protection. Fish wanted nothing to do with the island, but he dutifully brought up Faben's proposal to Grant at a cabinet meeting. On July 17, Grant sent his military White House aide Orville E. Babcock to evaluate the islands' resources, local conditions, and Báez's terms for annexation, but was given no diplomatic authority. When Babcock returned to Washington with two unauthorized annexation treaties, Grant, however, approved and pressured his cabinet to accept them. Grant ordered Fish to draw up formal treaties, sent to Báez by Babcock's return to the island nation. The Dominican Republic would be annexed for $1.5 million and Samaná Bay would be lease-purchased for $2 million. General D.B. Sackett and General Rufus Ingalls accompanied Babcock. On November 29, President Báez signed the treaties. On December 21, the treaties were placed before Grant and his cabinet.

Grant's grand plan to annex Santo Domingo, a black and mixed-race nation, into the United States, however, would be hostilely obstructed by Senator Charles Sumner. On December 31, Grant met with Sumner, unannounced, at Sumner's Washington D.C. home to gain his support for annexation. Grant left confident Sumner approved, but what Sumner actually said was controversially disputed, by various witnesses. Without appealing to the American public, to his detriment, Grant submitted the treaties on January 10, 1870, to the Senate Foreign Relations Committee, chaired by the stubborn and imperious Sumner, for ratification, but Sumner purposefully shelved the bills. Prompted by Grant to stop stalling the treaties, Sumner's committee took action but rejected the bills by a 5-to-2 vote. Sumner opposed annexation and reportedly said the Dominicans were "a turbulent, treacherous race" in a closed session of the Senate. Sumner sent the treaties for a full Senate vote, while Grant personally lobbied other senators. Despite Grant's efforts, the Senate defeated the treaties, on Thursday, June 30, by a 28–28 vote when a 2/3 majority was required.

Grant was outraged, and on Friday, July 1, 1870, he sacked his appointed Minister to Great Britain, John Lothrop Motley, Sumner's close friend and ally.  In January 1871, Grant signed a joint resolution to send a commission to investigate annexation. For this undertaking, he chose three neutral parties, with Fredrick Douglass to be secretary of the commission, that gave Grant the moral high ground from Sumner. Although the commission approved its findings, the Senate remained opposed, forcing Grant to abandon further efforts. Seeking retribution, in March 1871, Grant maneuvered to have Sumner deposed of Sumner's powerful Senate chairmanship, replaced by Grant ally Simon Cameron. The stinging controversy over Santo Domingo overshadowed Grant's foreign diplomacy. Critics complained of Grant's reliance on military personnel to implement his policies.

Cuba and Virginius Affair

American policy under Grant was to remain neutral during the Ten Years' War (1868–78), a series of long bloody revolts that were taking place in Cuba against Spanish rule. On the recommendation of Fish and Senator Sumner, Grant refused to recognize the belligerence of the rebels, and in effect endorsed Spanish colonial rule there, while calling for the abolition of slavery in Cuba. This was done to protect American commerce and to keep peace with Spain.

This fragile policy, however, was severely broken in October 1873, when a Spanish cruiser captured a merchant ship, Virginius, flying the U.S. flag, carrying supplies and men to aid the insurrection. Treating them as pirates, without trial, Spanish authorities executed 53 prisoners, including eight American citizens. American Captain Joseph Frye was executed and his crew was executed and decapitated and their lifeless bodies were mutilated, trampled by horses. Many enraged Americans protested and called for war with Spain. Grant ordered U.S. Navy Squadron warships to converge on Cuba, off of Key West, supported by the USS Kansas. On November 27, Fish reached a diplomatic resolution in which Spain's president, Emilio Castelar y Ripoll, expressed his regret, surrendered the Virginius and the surviving captives. A year later, Spain paid a cash indemnity of $80,000 to the families of the executed Americans.

Free trade with Hawaii

In the face of strong opposition from Democrats, Grant and Fish secured a free trade treaty in 1875 with the Kingdom of Hawaii, incorporating the Pacific islands' sugar industry into the United States' economic sphere. The Southern Democrats, wanting to protect American rice and sugar producers, tried to squash a bill to implement the Hawaiian treaty. The Democrats, in opposition, because the treaty was believed to be an island annexation attempt, referred to the Hawaiians as an "inferior" non-white race. Despite opposition, the implementation bill passed Congress.

Mexican border raids
At the close of Grant's second term in office, Fish had to contend Indian raids on the Mexican border, due to a lack of law enforcement over the U.S. – Mexican border. The problem would escalate during the Hayes' administration, under Fish's successor William Evarts.

Federal Indian policy

When Grant took office in 1869, the nation's policy towards Native Americans was in chaos, affecting more than 250,000 Native Americans being governed by 370 treaties. Grant's religious faith influenced his "peace" policy toward Native Americans, believing that the "Creator" did not place races of men on earth for the "stronger" to destroy the "weaker". President Grant was mostly an assimilationist, wanting Indians to adopt European customs, education, English language, Christianity, private property, clothing, and to accept democratic government, that would lead to eventual Indian citizenship. At Grant's 1869 Inauguration, Grant said "the proper treatment of the original occupants of the land, the Indian, is one deserving of careful study. I will favor any course towards them which tends to their civilization, Christianization and ultimate citizenship." Grant appointed Ely S. Parker, an assimilated Seneca and member of his wartime staff, to serve as the Commissioner of Indian Affairs, the first Native American to serve in this position, surprising many around him. 

In April 1869, Grant signed legislation establishing an unpaid Board of Indian Commissioners to reduce corruption and oversee the implementation of what was called Grant's Indian "Peace" policy. In 1870, a setback in Grant's policy occurred over the Marias Massacre, causing public outrage. In 1871, Grant ended the sovereign tribal treaty system; by law individual Native Americans were deemed wards of the federal government.  Grant's Indian policy was undermined by Parker's resignation in 1871, denominational infighting among Grant's chosen religious agents, and entrenched economic interests. Grant's Indian policy was also lampooned by an 1871 Thomas Nast cartoon, that depicted Grant as "Robinson Crusoe", forcing an Indian Chief, "his man Friday", into tightly fitted western attire. Nonetheless, Indian wars declined overall during Grant's first term, while on October 1, 1872, Major General Oliver Otis Howard negotiated peace with the Apache leader Cochise. On December 28, 1872, another setback took place to Grant's policy when General George Crook and the 5th Cavalry massacred about 75 Yavapai Apache Indians at Skeleton Cave, Arizona.

During his second term, Grant's Indian policy fell apart. On April 11, 1873, Major General Edward Canby was killed in Northern California south of Tule Lake by Modoc leader Kintpuash, in a failed peace conference to end the Modoc War. Grant ordered restraint after Canby's death. The army captured Kintpuash, who was convicted of Canby's murder and hanged on October 3 at Fort Klamath, while the remaining Modoc tribe was relocated to the Indian Territory. In 1874, the army defeated the Comanche at the Battle of Palo Duro Canyon, forcing them to finally settle at the Fort Sill reservation in 1875. Grant pocket-vetoed a bill in 1874 protecting bison, and instead supported Interior Secretary Columbus Delano, who correctly believed the killing of bison would force Plains Native Americans to abandon their nomadic lifestyle. In April 1875, another setback occurred to Grant's policy. The U.S. Army led by Lt. Austin Henly massacred 27 Cheyenne Indians, including 19 men, and 8 women and children, on the Sappa Creek, in Kansas.

With the lure of gold discovered in the Black Hills and the westward force of Manifest Destiny, white settlers trespassed on Sioux protected lands used for religious and marital ceremonies. Red Cloud reluctantly entered negotiations on May 26, 1875, but other Sioux chiefs readied for war. Grant told the Sioux leaders to make "arrangements to allow white persons to go into the Black Hills." Antagonistic toward Native American culture, Grant told them their children would attend schools, speak English, and prepare "for the life of white men."

On November 3, 1875, Grant held a meeting at the White House and, under advice from Sheridan, agreed not to enforce keeping out miners from the Black Hills, forcing Native Americans onto the Sioux reservation. Sheridan told Grant that the U.S. Army was undermanned and the territory involved was vast, requiring great numbers of soldiers to enforce the treaty.

During the Great Sioux War that started after Sitting Bull refused to relocate to agency land, warriors led by Crazy Horse massacred George Armstrong Custer and 268 of his men at the Battle of the Little Big Horn. The slaughter took place during the Centennial, and the Indian victory was announced to the nation on July 4, while angry white settlers demanded retribution. Grant castigated Custer in the press, saying "I regard Custer's massacre as a sacrifice of troops, brought on by Custer himself, that was wholly unnecessary—wholly unnecessary." Previously, Custer had infuriated Grant when he testified against Grant's brother Orville during a House investigation into trading post graft on March 1, 1876. In September and October 1876, Grant persuaded the tribes to relinquish the Black Hills. Congress ratified the agreement three days before Grant left office in 1877.

Election of 1872 and second term

Grant's first administration was mixed with both success and failure. In 1871, to placate reformers, he created the America's first Civil Service Commission, chaired by reformer George William Curtis.

The Liberal Republicans, composed of reformers, men who supported low tariffs, and those who opposed Grant's prosecution of the Klan, broke from Grant and the Republican Party. The Liberals, who personally disliked Grant, detested his alliance with Senator Simon Cameron and Senator Roscoe Conkling, considered to be spoilsmen politicians.

In 1872, the Liberals nominated Horace Greeley, a leading Republican New York Tribune editor and a fierce enemy of Grant, for president, and Missouri governor B. Gratz Brown, for vice president. The Liberals denounced Grantism, corruption, nepotism, and inefficiency, demanded the withdrawal of federal troops from the South, literacy tests for blacks to vote, and amnesty for Confederates. The Democrats adopted the Greeley-Brown ticket and the Liberals party platform. Greeley, whose Tribune gave him wider name recognition and a louder campaign voice, pushed the themes that the Grant administration was failed and corrupt.

The Republicans nominated Grant for reelection, with Senator Henry Wilson of Massachusetts replacing Colfax as the vice presidential nominee. The Republicans shrewdly borrowed from the Liberals' party platform, including "extended amnesty, lowered tariffs, and embraced civil service reform." Grant lowered customs duties, gave amnesty to former Confederates, and implemented a civil service merit system, neutralizing the opposition. To placate the burgeoning suffragist movement, the Republicans' platform mentioned that women's rights would be treated with "respectful consideration." Concerning Southern policy, Greeley advocated that local government control be given to whites, while Grant advocated federal protection of blacks. Grant was supported by Frederick Douglass, prominent abolitionists, and Indian reformers.

Grant won reelection easily thanks to federal prosecution of the Klan, a strong economy, debt reduction, lowered tariffs, and tax reductions. He received 3.6 million (55.6%) votes to Greeley's 2.8 million votes and an Electoral College landslide of 286 to 66. A majority of African Americans in the South voted for Grant, while Democratic opposition remained mostly peaceful. Grant lost in six former slave states that wanted to see an end to Reconstruction. He proclaimed the victory as a personal vindication of his presidency, but inwardly he felt betrayed by the Liberals. Grant was sworn in for his second term by Salmon P. Chase on March 4, 1873. In his second inaugural address, he reiterated the problems still facing the nation and focused on what he considered the chief issues of the day: freedom and fairness for all Americans while emphasizing the benefits of citizenship for freed slaves. Grant concluded his address with the words, "My efforts in the future will be directed towards the restoration of good feelings between the different sections of our common community". In 1873, Wilson suffered a stroke; never fully recovering, he died in office on November 22, 1875. With Wilson's loss, Grant relied on Fish's guidance more than ever.

Panic of 1873 and loss of House
Grant continued to work for a strong dollar, signing into law the Coinage Act of 1873, which effectively ended the legal basis for bimetallism (the use of both silver and gold as money), establishing the gold standard in practice. The Coinage Act discontinued the standard silver dollar and established the gold dollar as the sole monetary standard; because the gold supply did not increase as quickly as the population, the result was deflation. Silverites, who wanted more money in circulation to raise the prices that farmers received, denounced the move as the "Crime of 1873", claiming the deflation made debts more burdensome for farmers.

Economic turmoil renewed during Grant's second term. In September 1873, Jay Cooke & Company, a New York brokerage house, collapsed after it failed to sell all of the bonds issued by Cooke's Northern Pacific Railway. The collapse rippled through Wall Street, and other banks and brokerages that owned railroad stocks and bonds were also ruined. On September 20, the New York Stock Exchange suspended trading for ten days. Grant, who knew little about finance, traveled to New York to consult leading businessmen and bankers for advice on how to resolve the crisis, which became known as the Panic of 1873. Grant believed that, as with the collapse of the Gold Ring in 1869, the panic was merely an economic fluctuation that affected bankers and brokers. He instructed the Treasury to buy $10 million in government bonds, injecting cash into the system. The purchases curbed the panic on Wall Street, but an industrial depression, later called the Long Depression, nonetheless swept the nation. Many of the nation's railroads—89 out of 364—went bankrupt.

Congress hoped inflation would stimulate the economy and passed The Ferry Bill, which became known as the "Inflation Bill" in 1874. Many farmers and workingmen favored the bill, which would have added $64 million in greenbacks to circulation, but some Eastern bankers opposed it because it would have weakened the dollar. Belknap, Williams, and Delano told Grant a veto would hurt Republicans in the November elections. Grant believed the bill would destroy the credit of the nation, and he vetoed it despite their objections. Grant's veto placed him in the conservative faction of the Republican Party and was the beginning of the party's commitment to a gold-backed dollar. Grant later pressured Congress for a bill to further strengthen the dollar by gradually reducing the number of greenbacks in circulation. When the Democrats gained a majority in the House after the 1874 elections, the lame-duck Republican Congress did so before the Democrats took office. On January 14, 1875, Grant signed the Specie Payment Resumption Act, which required gradual reduction of the number of greenbacks allowed to circulate and declared that they would be redeemed for gold beginning on January 1, 1879.

Reforms and scandals

The post-Civil War economy brought on massive industrial wealth and government expansion. Speculation, lifestyle extravagance, and corruption in federal offices were rampant. All of Grant's executive departments were investigated by Congress. Grant by nature was honest, trusting, gullible, and extremely loyal to his chosen friends. His responses to malfeasance were mixed, at times appointing cabinet reformers, but also at times defending culprits.

Grant in his first term appointed Secretary of Interior Jacob D. Cox, who implemented civil service reform: he fired unqualified clerks, and took other measures. On October 3, 1870, Cox resigned office under a dispute with Grant over handling of a mining claim. Authorized by Congress on March 3, 1871, Grant created and appointed the first Civil Service Commission. Grant's Commission created rules for competitive exams, the end of mandatory political assessments, classifying positions into grades, and appointees were chosen from the top three performing federal applicants. The rules took effect on January 1, 1872, but Department heads, and others were exempted. Grant, more than any previous president, elevated the federal civil service, but his critics refused to acknowledge this.

In November 1871, Grant's appointed New York Collector, and Conkling ally, Thomas Murphy, resigned. Grant replaced Murphy with another Conkling ally, Chester A. Arthur, who implemented Boutwell's reforms. A Senate committee investigated the New York Customs House from January 3, 1872, to June 4, 1872. Previous Grant appointed collectors Murphy and Moses H. Grinnell charged lucrative fees for warehouse space, without the legal requirement of listing the goods. This led to Grant firing warehouse owner George K. Leet, for pocketing the exorbitant freight fees and splitting the profits.  Boutwell's reforms included stricter record-keeping and that goods be stored on company docks. Grant ordered prosecutions in New York by Attorney General George H. Williams and Secretary of Treasury Boutwell of persons accepting and paying for bribes. Although exonerated, Grant was derided for his association with Conkling's New York patronage machine.

On March 3, 1873, Grant signed into law an appropriation act that increased pay for federal employees, Congress (retroactive), the Judiciary, and the President. Grant's annual salary doubled from $25,000 to $50,000. Critics derided Congress' two year retroactive, "services rendered", $4,000 lump sum payment for each Congressman, and the law was partially repealed. Grant, however, kept his much needed pay raise, while his personal reputation remained intact.

In 1872, Grant signed into law an act that ended private moiety (tax collection) contracts, but an attached rider allowed three more contracts. Boutwell's assistant secretary William A. Richardson, hired John B. Sanborn to go after "individuals and cooperations" who allegedly evaded taxes. Retained by Richardson (as Secretary), Sanborn aggressively collected $213,000, while splitting $156,000 to others, including Richardson, and the Republican Party campaign committee. During an 1874 Congressional investigation, Richardson denied involvement, but Sanborn said he met with Richardson six times over the contracts. Congress severely condemned Richardson's permissive manner. Grant appointed Richardson judge of the Court of Claims, and replaced him with reformer Benjamin Bristow. In June, Grant and Congress abolished the moiety system.

Bristow effectively cleaned house, tightened up the Treasury's investigation force, implemented civil service, and fired hundreds of corrupt appointees. Bristow discovered Treasury receipts were low, and launched an investigation that uncovered the notorious Whiskey Ring, that involved collusion between distillers and Treasury officials to evade paying the Treasury millions in tax revenues. Much of this money was being pocketed while some of it went into Republican coffers. In mid-April, Bristow informed Grant of the ring. On May 10, Bristow struck hard and broke the ring. Federal marshals raided 32 installations nationwide and arrested 350 men; 176 indictments were obtained, leading to 110 convictions and $3,150,000 in fines returned to the Treasury.

Grant appointed David Dyer, under Bristow's recommendation, federal attorney to prosecute the Ring in St. Louis, who indicted Grant's old friend General John McDonald, supervisor of Internal Revenue. Grant endorsed Bristow's investigation writing on a letter "Let no guilty man escape..." Bristow's investigation discovered Babcock received kickback payments, and that Babcock had secretly forewarned McDonald, the ring's mastermind boss, of the coming investigation. On November 22, the jury convicted McDonald. On December 9, Babcock was indicted, however, Grant refused to believe in Babcock's guilt, was ready to testify in Babcock's favor, but Fish warned that doing so would put Grant in the embarrassing position of testifying against a case prosecuted by his own administration. Instead, Grant remained in Washington and on February 12, 1876, gave a deposition in Babcock's defense, expressing that his confidence in his secretary was "unshaken". Grant's testimony silenced all but his strongest critics.

The St. Louis jury acquitted Babcock, but Grant allowed Babcock to remain at the White House. However, after Babcock was indicted in a frame up of a Washington reformer, called the Safe Burglary Conspiracy,
Grant finally dismissed him from the White House. Babcock kept his position of Superintendent of Public Buildings in Washington. 

The Interior Department under Secretary Columbus Delano, whom Grant appointed to replace Cox, was rife with fraud and corruption. The exception was Delano's effective oversight of Yellowstone. Grant reluctantly forced Delano's resignation. Surveyor General Silas Reed had set up corrupt contracts that benefited Delano's son, John Delano. Grant's Secretary Interior Zachariah Chandler, who succeeded Delano in 1875, implemented reforms, fired corrupt agents and ended profiteering. When Grant was informed by Postmaster Marshall Jewell of a potential Congressional investigation into an extortion scandal involving Attorney General George H. Williams' wife, Grant fired Williams and appointed reformer Edwards Pierrepont in his place. Grant's new cabinet appointments temporarily appeased reformers.

After the Democrats took control of the House in 1875, more corruption in federal departments was exposed. Among the most damaging scandal involved Secretary of War William W. Belknap, who took quarterly kickbacks from the Fort Sill tradership, which led to his resignation in February 1876. Belknap was impeached by the House but was acquitted by the Senate. Grant's own brother Orvil set up "silent partnerships" and received kickbacks from four trading posts. Congress discovered that Secretary of Navy Robeson had been bribed by a naval contractor, but no articles of impeachment were drawn up. In his December 5, 1876, Eighth Annual Message, Grant apologized to the nation: "Failures have been errors of judgement, not of intent."

Election of 1876

The abandonment of Reconstruction by the nation played a central role during the Election of 1876. Mounting investigations into corruption by the House, controlled by the Democrats, politically discredited Grant's presidency. Grant, by a public letter in 1875, chose not to run for a third term, while the Republicans chose Governor Rutherford B. Hayes of Ohio, a reformer, at their convention. The Democrats nominated Governor Samuel J. Tilden of New York. Voting irregularities in three Southern states caused the election that year to remain undecided for several months. Grant told Congress to settle the matter through legislation and assured both sides that he would not use the army to force a result, except to curb violence. On January 29, 1877, he signed legislation forming an Electoral Commission to decide the matter. Hayes was ruled elected President by the commission; to forestall Democratic protests, Republicans agreed to the Compromise of 1877, in which the last troops were withdrawn from Southern capitals. With Reconstruction dead, an 80-year era of Jim Crow segregation was launched. Grant's "calm visage" throughout the election crisis appeased the nation.

To the chagrin of Grant, President Hayes appointed Reconstruction critics, including Liberal Republican icon Carl Schurz to Secretary of Interior.

Post-presidency (1877–1885)

After leaving the White House, Grant said he "was never so happy in my life". The Grants left Washington for New York, to attend the birth of their daughter Nellie's child, staying at Hamilton Fish's residence. Calling themselves "waifs", the Grants toured Cincinnati, St. Louis, Chicago, and Galena, without a clear idea of where they would live afterward.

World tour and diplomacy

For some years Grant had entertained the idea of taking a long-deserved vacation after his presidency and, after liquidating one of his investments to finance the venture, the Grants set out on a world tour that lasted approximately two and a half years. Grant's voyage abroad was funded by a Nevada-based mining company investment he made that earned him $25,000 ($ in  dollars). Preparing for the tour, they arrived in Philadelphia on May 10, 1877, and were honored with celebrations during the week before their departure. On May 16, Grant and Julia left for England aboard the SS Indiana. During the tour the Grants made stops in Europe, Africa, India, and points in the Middle East and Far East, meeting with notable dignitaries such as Queen Victoria, Pope Leo XIII, Otto von Bismarck, Li Hongzhang, Emperor Meiji and others. Grant was the first U.S. president to visit Jerusalem and the Holy Land.

In August 1878, Grant visited St. Petersburg and Moscow in Russia. When the Grants arrived in St. Petersburg, Tsar Alexander II sent out an imperial carriage that brought them to meet the Tsar at his Summer Palace. The Tsar was interested in the warfare of Native Americans and asked Grant about the future of the Plains Indians, while Grant attempted to answer him satisfactorily. In St. Petersburg, as was his custom, and as a man with common roots, Grant mingled and conversed with the local people. U.S. Minister to Russia Edwin W. Stoughton escorted the Grants to see the ceremonial Russian man-of-war Peter the Great and Grant was given a seventeen-gun salute.

As a courtesy to Grant by the Hayes administration, his touring party received federal transportation on three U.S. Navy ships: a five-month tour of the Mediterranean on the USS Vandalia, travel from Hong Kong to China on the USS Ashuelot, and transportation from China to Japan on the USS Richmond. During the tour, the Hayes administration encouraged Grant to assume a public unofficial diplomatic role to represent the United States and strengthen American interests abroad, while resolving issues for some countries in the process. Homesick, the Grants left Japan sailing on the SS City of Tokio escorted by a Japanese man-of-war, crossed the Pacific and landed in San Francisco on September 20, 1879, greeted by cheering crowds. Before returning home to Philadelphia, Grant stopped at Chicago for a reunion with General Sherman and the Army of the Tennessee. Grant's tour demonstrated to Europe and Asia that the United States was an emerging world power.

Third term attempt

Stalwarts, led by Grant's old political ally, Roscoe Conkling, saw Grant's renewed popularity as an opportunity to regain power, and sought to nominate him for the presidency in 1880. Opponents called it a violation of the unofficial two-term rule in use since George Washington. Grant said nothing publicly but wanted the job and encouraged his men. Washburne urged him to run; Grant demurred, saying he would be happy for the Republicans to win with another candidate, though he preferred James G. Blaine to John Sherman. Even so, Conkling and John A. Logan began to organize delegates in Grant's favor. When the convention convened in Chicago in June, there were more delegates pledged to Grant than to any other candidate, but he was still short of a majority vote to get the nomination.

At the convention, Conkling nominated Grant with an eloquent speech, the most famous line being: "When asked which state he hails from, our sole reply shall be, he hails from Appomattox and its famous apple tree." With 370 votes needed for the nomination, the first ballot had Grant at 304, Blaine at 284, Sherman at 93, and the rest to minor candidates. Subsequent ballots followed, with roughly the same result; neither Grant nor Blaine could win. After thirty-six ballots, Blaine's delegates deserted him and combined with those of other candidates to nominate a compromise candidate: Representative and former Union general James A. Garfield of Ohio. A procedural motion made the vote unanimous for Garfield, who accepted the nomination. Grant gave speeches for Garfield but declined to criticize the Democratic nominee, Winfield Scott Hancock, a general who had served under him in the Army of the Potomac. Garfield won the election. Grant gave Garfield his public support and pushed him to include Stalwarts in his administration. On July 2, 1881, Garfield was shot by an assassin and died on September 19. On learning of Garfield's death from a reporter, Grant wept bitterly.

Business failures
In the 19th century, there were no federal presidential pensions, and the Grants' personal income was limited to $6,000 a year. Grant's world tour had been costly, and he had depleted most of his savings, while he needed to earn money and find a new home. Wealthy friends bought him a house on Manhattan's Upper East Side, and to make an income, Grant, Jay Gould, and former Mexican Finance Secretary Matías Romero chartered the Mexican Southern Railroad, with plans to build a railroad from Oaxaca to Mexico City. Grant urged Chester A. Arthur, who had succeeded Garfield as president in 1881, to negotiate a free trade treaty with Mexico. Arthur and the Mexican government agreed, but the United States Senate rejected the treaty in 1883. The railroad was similarly unsuccessful, falling into bankruptcy the following year.

At the same time, Grant's son Buck had opened a Wall Street brokerage house with Ferdinand Ward—although a conniving man who swindled numerous wealthy men, Ward was at the time regarded as a rising star on Wall Street. The firm, Grant & Ward, was initially successful. In 1883, Grant joined the firm and invested $100,000 of his own money. Grant, however, warned Ward that if his firm engaged in government business he would dissolve their partnership. To encourage investment, Ward paid investors abnormally high interest, by pledging the company's securities on multiple loans in a process called rehypothecation, which would now be understood as a Ponzi scheme. Ward, in collusion with banker James D. Fish and kept secret from bank examiners, retrieved the firm's securities from the company's bank vault. When the trades went bad, multiple loans came due, all backed up by the same collateral.

Historians agree that The elder Grant was likely unaware of Ward's intentions, but it is unclear how much Buck Grant knew. In May 1884, enough investments went bad to convince Ward that the firm would soon be bankrupt. Ward, who assumed Grant was "a child in business matters," told him of the impending failure, but assured Grant that this was a temporary shortfall. Grant approached businessman William Henry Vanderbilt, who gave him a personal loan of $150,000. Grant invested the money in the firm, but it was not enough to save it from failure. The fall of Grant & Ward set off the Panic of 1884.

Vanderbilt offered to forgive Grant's debt entirely, an offer Grant refused. Essentially penniless, but compelled by a sense of personal honor he repaid what he could with his Civil War mementos and the sale or transfer of all other assets. Vanderbilt took title to Grant's home, although he allowed the Grants to continue to reside there, and pledged to donate the souvenirs to the federal government and insisted the debt had been paid in full. Grant was distraught over Ward's deception and asked privately how he could ever "trust any human being again."

In March 1885, as his health was failing, he testified against both Ward and Fish. Ward was convicted of fraud in October 1885, months after Grant's death, and served six and a half years in prison. After the collapse of Grant & Ward, there was an outpouring of sympathy for Grant.

Memoirs, military pension, and death

Throughout his career, Grant repeatedly told highly detailed stories of his military experiences, often making slight mistakes in terms of dates and locations. As a poor hardscrabble farmer in St. Louis just before the war, he kept his neighbors spellbound until midnight "listening intently to his vivid narrations of Army experiences." In calm moments during the Civil War, he often spoke of his recent experiences, typically "in terse and often eloquent language." Grant's interpretations changed—in his letters written during the Mexican War period, there is no criticism of the war. By contrast his Memoirs are highly critical of the political aspects, condemning the war as unwarranted aggression by the United States. Grant told and retold his war stories so many times that writing his Memoirs was more a matter of repetition and polish rather than trying to recall his memories for the first time.

In the summer of 1884, Grant complained of a sore throat but put off seeing a doctor until late October, when he learned it was cancer, possibly caused by his frequent cigar smoking. Grant chose not to reveal the seriousness of his condition to his wife, who soon found out from Grant's doctor. Before being diagnosed, Grant attended a Methodist service for Civil War veterans in Ocean Grove, New Jersey, on August 4, 1884, receiving a standing ovation from more than ten thousand veterans and others; it would be his last public appearance. In March of the following year, The New York Times announced that Grant was dying of cancer, and a nationwide public concern for the former president began. Knowing of Grant and Julia's financial difficulties, Congress sought to honor him and restored him to the rank of General of the Army with full retirement pay—Grant's assumption of the presidency in 1869 had required that he resign his commission and forfeit his (and his widow's) pension.

Grant was nearly broke and worried constantly about leaving his wife a suitable amount of money to live on. Imagining that a set of memoirs might provide this, Grant approached The Century Magazine, which offered Grant a book contract with a 10 percent royalty, but Grant's friend Mark Twain, one of the few who understood how precarious Grant's financial condition actually was, made him an offer for his memoirs that paid an unheard-of 70 percent royalty. To provide for his family, Grant worked intensely on his memoirs at his home in New York City. His former staff member Adam Badeau assisted him with much of the research, while his son Frederick located documents and did much of the fact-checking. Because of the summer heat and humidity, his doctors recommended that he move upstate to a cottage at the top of Mount McGregor, offered by a family friend.

On July 18, 1885, Grant finished his memoir; he lived for only five more days. Grant's memoirs treat his early life and time in the Mexican–American War briefly and include the events of his life up to the end of the Civil War. The Personal Memoirs of U. S. Grant was a critical and commercial success. Julia Grant eventually received about $450,000 in royalties. The memoir has been highly regarded by the public, military historians, and literary critics. Grant portrayed himself in the persona of the honorable Western hero, whose strength lies in his honesty and straightforwardness. He candidly depicted his battles against both the Confederates and internal army foes.

After a year-long struggle with throat cancer, surrounded by his family, Grant died at 8:08 a.m. in the Mount McGregor cottage on July 23, 1885, at the age of 63. Sheridan, then Commanding General of the Army, ordered a day-long tribute to Grant on all military posts, and President Grover Cleveland ordered a thirty-day nationwide period of mourning. After private services, the honor guard placed Grant's body on a special funeral train, which traveled to West Point and New York City. A quarter of a million people viewed it in the two days before the funeral. Tens of thousands of men, many of them veterans from the Grand Army of the Republic (GAR), marched with Grant's casket drawn by two dozen black stallions to Riverside Park in the Morningside Heights neighborhood of Upper Manhattan. His pallbearers included Union generals Sherman and Sheridan, Confederate generals Simon Bolivar Buckner and Joseph E. Johnston, Admiral David Dixon Porter, and Senator John A. Logan, the head of the GAR. Following the casket in the  procession were President Cleveland, the two living former presidents Hayes and Arthur, all of the President's Cabinet, as well as the justices of the Supreme Court.

Attendance at the New York funeral topped 1.5 million. Ceremonies were held in other major cities around the country, while Grant was eulogized in the press and likened to George Washington and Abraham Lincoln. Grant's body was laid to rest in Riverside Park, first in a temporary tomb, and then—twelve years later, on April 17, 1897—in the General Grant National Memorial, also known as "Grant's Tomb", the largest mausoleum in North America.

Historical reputation

Grant was hailed across the North as the winning general in the American Civil War and overall his military reputation has held up quite well. Achieving great national fame for his victories at Vicksburg and the surrender at Appomattox, he was widely credited as the General who "saved the Union".  Grant was the most successful general, Union or Confederate, to dominate the Civil War. Criticized by the South for using excessive force, his overall military reputation stands intact. Grant's drinking was often exaggerated by the press and falsely stereotyped by many of his rivals and critics. During the late 19th and early 20th centuries, Grant's reputation was damaged by the Lost Cause movement and the Dunning School.

Views of Grant reached new lows as he was seen as an unsuccessful president and an unskilled, if lucky, general. In the 1950s, some historians made a reassessment of Grant's military career, shifting the analysis of Grant as the victor by brute force to that of successful, skillful, modern strategist and commander. Historian William S. McFeely's biography, Grant (1981), won the Pulitzer Prize, and brought renewed scholarly interest in Grant. McFeely believed Grant was an "ordinary American" trying to "make his mark" during the 19th Century.  In the 21st century, Grant's reputation improved markedly among historians after the publication of Grant (2001), by historian Jean Edward Smith. Opinions of Grant's presidency demonstrate a better appreciation of Grant's personal integrity, Reconstruction efforts, and peace policy towards Indians, even when they fell short.
 
H.W. Brands' The Man Who Saved the Union (2012), Ronald C. White's American Ulysses (2016) and Ron Chernow's Grant (2017) continued the elevation of Grant's historical reputation. White said Grant, "demonstrated a distinctive sense of humility, moral courage, and determination," and as president he "stood up for African Americans, especially fighting against voter suppression perpetrated by the Ku Klux Klan." White believed Grant was "an exceptional person and leader." Charles W. Calhoun's The Presidency of Ulysses S. Grant (2017) noted Grant's successes in office, but asked whether Grant's revived reputation was found in the "popular consciousness."

Historians still debate how effective Grant was at halting corruption. The scandals during the Grant administration were often used to stigmatize his political reputation. Militarily evaluated, Grant was a modern general and "a skillful leader who had a natural grasp of tactics and strategy."

Grant's successful Civil War military strategies have been recognized and adapted into successful business practices. According to historian David Heffernan, Grant's presidency has been "unfairly denigrated" for generations, disregarding his prosecution of the Klan, and peaceful resolution of the controversial Election of 1876. Historian Robert Farley is concerned that the Cult of Lee and the Dunning School were resentful of Grant for his strong enforcement of Reconstruction, prosecution of the Klan, and the defeat of Lee at Appomatox, resulted in Grant's shoddy treatment by historians. Farley said the Cult of Lee had "little room for Grant, in no small part because Grant was the only president to vigorously pursue Reconstruction and the first to treat blacks as both human and American."

In a 2021 C-SPAN survey ranking Presidents from worst to best, Grant was ranked 20 out of 43 Presidents. Grant was noted for being "a strong advocate for civil rights" during his presidency.

On December 23, 2022, the bicentenary of  Grant's birth, Grant was authorized for posthumous promotion to the rank of General of the Armies of the United States as part of the 2023 Defense Authorization Bill. Preceded by George Washington and John J. Pershing, Grant will become the third person to hold this rank if the authorization is acted on by the President.

Memorials and presidential library

Several memorials honor Grant. In addition to his mausoleum—Grant's Tomb in New York City—there is the Ulysses S. Grant Memorial at the foot of Capitol Hill in Washington, D.C. Created by sculptor Henry Merwin Shrady and architect Edward Pearce Casey, and dedicated in 1922, it overlooks the Capitol Reflecting Pool. In 2015, restoration work began, which is expected to be completed before the bicentennial of Grant's birth in 2022.

The Ulysses S. Grant National Historic Site near St. Louis, and several other sites in Ohio and Illinois memorialize Grant's life. The U.S. Grant Cottage State Historic Site, located at the top of Mount McGregor in Wilton, New York, preserves the house in which he completed his memoirs and died. There are smaller memorials in Chicago's Lincoln Park and Philadelphia's Fairmount Park. Named in his honor are Grant Park, as well as several counties in western and midwestern states. On June 3, 1891, a bronze statue of Grant by Danish sculptor Johannes Gelert was dedicated at Grant Park in Galena, Illinois. From 1890 to 1940, part of what is now Kings Canyon National Park was called General Grant National Park, named for the General Grant sequoia.

In May 2012, the Ulysses S. Grant Foundation, on the institute's fiftieth anniversary, selected Mississippi State University as the permanent location for Ulysses S. Grant's presidential library. Historian John Y. Simon edited Grant's letters into a 32-volume scholarly edition published by Southern Illinois University Press.

Grant's image has appeared on the front of the United States fifty-dollar bill since 1913. In 1921, the Ulysses S. Grant Centenary Association was founded with the goal of coordinating special observances and erecting monuments in recognition of Grant's historical role. The venture was financed by the minting of 10,000 gold dollars (depicted below) and 250,000 half dollars. The coins were minted and issued in 1922, commemorating the 100th anniversary of Grant's birth. Grant has also appeared on several U.S. postage stamps, the first one issued in 1890, five years after his death.

On June 19, 2020, Juneteenth protesters toppled a bronze bust, U. S. Grant (1896), at Golden Gate Park in San Francisco. Grant had briefly owned one slave, whom he set free. Grant's statue bust will unlikely return to Golden Gate Park.

Dates of rank

See also
 List of American Civil War battles
 List of American Civil War generals (Union)

Notes

References

Bibliography

Biographical
 
 
   
 
 
 
  scholarly review and response by Calhoun at 
 
 
 ; scholarly review at 
 
 
 
 
 
 
 
  online free
 
 
 
 
 
 
 
 
 
 
 
 
 
 
 
 
 
 
 
 
 
 
 
 
 
 
 
 
 
 
 

Military and politics
 
 

 
 
 
 
 
 
 
 
 
 
 
 
 
 
 
 
 
 
 
 
 
 
 
 
 
 
 
 
 
 
 
 
 
 
 
 
 
 
 
 

Primary sources
 
  – Many editions in paper and online; ends in 1865
 
 
 
 
 

Historiography
 Arnold, Matthew. General Grant by Matthew Arnold with a Rejoinder by Mark Twain. Kent, Ohio, and London, England: The Kent State University Press, 1995 (on Grant's Memoirs)
 
 
 
 
 
 
 

Marszalek, John F.; Nolen, David S.; Gallo, Louie P.; Williams, Frank J. (2019). Hold On With a Bullldog Grip: A Short Study of Ulysses S. Grant. Jackson, Mississippi: University Press of Mississippi.
 
 
 
 
 
 
 
  (Ch. IV. "Northern Soldiers: Ulysses S. Grant")
 
 
 
 
 
 
 
 
 
 
 
 
 
 
 Churchill, Ward, A Little Matter of Genocide: Holocaust and Denial in the Americas, 1492 to the Present, City Lights, 1997, 381 pages,

External links

 Miller Center on the Presidency at U of Virginia, brief articles on Grant and his presidency  
 
 
 
 
 Ulysses S. Grant National Historic Site Missouri – National Park Service
 Ulysses S. Grant Presidential Library
 Ulysses S. Grant: A Resource Guide – Library of Congress (COLLECTION: Ulysses S. Grant Papers)
 
 "Life Portrait of Ulysses S. Grant", from C-SPAN's American presidents: Life Portraits, July 12, 1999
 Ulysses S. Grant Personal Manuscripts

 
1822 births
1885 deaths
19th-century American male writers
19th-century American memoirists
19th-century American politicians
19th-century Methodists
19th-century presidents of the United States
Activists for African-American civil rights
American Methodists
American military personnel of the Mexican–American War
American people of English descent
American people of Irish descent
American slave owners
Burials in New York (state)
Candidates in the 1868 United States presidential election
Candidates in the 1872 United States presidential election
Candidates in the 1880 United States presidential election
Civil rights in the United States
Commanding Generals of the United States Army
Congressional Gold Medal recipients
Deaths from cancer in New York (state)
Deaths from throat cancer
George Washington University trustees
Hall of Fame for Great Americans inductees
Illinois Republicans
Members of the American Philosophical Society
Members of the Aztec Club of 1847
People from Clermont County, Ohio
People from Georgetown, Ohio
People of Illinois in the American Civil War
People of the Reconstruction Era
Presidents of the National Rifle Association
Presidents of the United States
Republican Party (United States) presidential nominees
Republican Party presidents of the United States
Sons of the American Revolution
Stalwarts (Republican Party)
Union Army generals
United States Military Academy alumni